Merrifield Park is a  public park in the Parkrose Heights neighborhood of northeastern Portland, Oregon, United States. The park was acquired in 1985.

References

External links

 

1985 establishments in Oregon
Northeast Portland, Oregon
Parks in Portland, Oregon